Belmont Park (French: Parc Belmont) was an amusement park that operated between 1923 and 1983 in the Montreal neighborhood of Cartierville in Quebec, Canada.

Located on the banks of Riviere des Prairies, Belmont Park was best known for its wooden roller coaster, the Cyclone, but at one time or another had a Philadelphia Toboggan Company carousel, Ferris wheel, picnic grounds, dance hall, swimming pool, roller skating rink plus numerous other rides for adults and a "Kiddieland."

Belmont Park, which had opened on June 9, 1923, closed permanently on October 13, 1983. This followed a police raid that may have been motivated by city hall's displeasure at the park, a private venture, taking away business from the then city-owned La Ronde.

Media
In 1972, it was the object of a short film, À mort (To Death), by Pierre Falardeau. It also served as the setting for the 1957 National Film Board of Canada film Pierrot in Montreal, in which mime Guy Hoffman demonstrates the stock character Pierrot.

Gallery

See also
 La Ronde (amusement park)

References

External links

 Archival footage from French CBC site
 Coaster Enthusiasts of Canada website for Belmont Park including history and a number of photos
 A French-language Group by Di Iorio

Defunct amusement parks in Canada
History of Montreal
1923 establishments in Quebec
1983 disestablishments in Quebec
Ahuntsic-Cartierville
Amusement parks opened in 1923
Amusement parks closed in 1983
20th-century disestablishments in Quebec
Canada geography articles needing translation from French Wikipedia